"Wrapped" is a song written by Bruce Robison. First recorded on his 1998 album Wrapped, then by Kelly Willis on her 1998 album What I Deserve, it was later covered by American country music artist George Strait on his 2006 album It Just Comes Natural. It was released on March 19, 2007 as the album's third single; Strait's version of the song reached number two on the Billboard country chart.

Content
"Wrapped" is a mid-tempo where the narrator explains his inability to stop thinking about a lover who has left.

This is the second single of George Strait's career that was written and originally recorded by Bruce Robison.  The first such single was Robison's "Desperately", also a cut from his album Wrapped, that Strait covered on his 2003 album Honkytonkville.

Critical reception
Stephen Thomas Erlewine of AllMusic cited the song as a standout track on It Just Comes Natural, saying that the song was "laid-back" and that Strait's backing band sounded "natural" on the track.

Chart performance

Year-end charts

Other versions
The song has been covered by the following musicians.
 Kelly Willis, on her album What I Deserve (1998)
 George Strait, on his album It Just Comes Natural (2006); released on March 19, 2007 as the album's third single; Strait's version of the song was a Top 5 country hit, reaching #2 on the Billboard country charts
 Pinmonkey, on their album Big Shiny Cars (2006)
 Catherine Britt, on her album Too Far Gone (2007)

References

1998 songs
2007 singles
Bruce Robison songs
Kelly Willis songs
George Strait songs
Song recordings produced by Tony Brown (record producer)
Songs written by Bruce Robison
MCA Nashville Records singles